Christian Ngan (born 23 December 1983, Douala, Cameroon) is a Cameroonian businessman, and the owner of Adlyn Holdings and Madlyn Cazalis Group, which has interests in cosmetics, agribusiness and real estate. The company designs, manufactures, transports natural beauty products and operates in Central Africa and West Africa. 

In 2014 and 2015, Ngan was listed in Forbes magazine's "30 Most Promising Young Entrepreneurs in Africa".

Early life and education

Christian Ngan, was born in Douala on 23 December 1983 into a middle-class Christian Cameroonian family, and spent his childhood in Yaoundé. In 2002, after his baccalauréat, he went to study in France. He initially studied economics at Panthéon-Assas University, then received a bachelor's degree in Business Administration, a master's degree in management, and a master's degree in International Affairs from Pantheon-Sorbonne University. In 2010, he received a master's degree in Financial Engineering from EMLYON Business School in Lyon. In 2017, he attended the Global Strategic Leadership Program at the Wharton School of the University of Pennsylvania and the Agribusiness Program at the Harvard Business School in 2018.

Career

Ngan worked as an Associate at Findercod, an Investment Banking firm in Paris where he dedicated himself to the long-term financing and Private Equity areas. In 2010, he worked within the Corporate Finance division of Quilvest Group, a Family Office and Private Equity fund with $36 billion assets under management. Ngan worked essentially on mergers, acquisitions, and fundraising assignments in numerous sectors such as Cleantech, Technology, Media, Telecom, Financial Services, and Luxury. He previously worked at Société Générale Credit and Investment Banking in Paris as a Leveraged Buy-Out Analyst and spent several months at the Ministry of the Economy and Finance in Cameroon as an Economic Research Assistant.

In July 2012, aged 28, Ngan returned to Cameroon to start his own cosmetic company, Madlyn Cazalis, with $3,000. Ngan founded Madlyn Cazalis to prevent young Africans from dangers of whitening their skins, by encouraging natural products.

Ngan is an international guest speaker promoting African entrepreneurship. On 23 February 2013, he took part in TEDxAkwa in Douala, which was the first TED (Conference) in French-speaking Africa.

Since 2013, Ngan is also Honorary Member of The Cameroonian Consumers League (LCC).

On 4 March 2014, he organized a Beauty Symposium in Yaoundé. where he met the Cameroonian Ministry of Woman and Family Promotion.

On 25 April 2014, Ngan was invited to Libreville by Ali Bongo Ondimba, President of Gabon to share his entrepreneurial experience in Africa. He was also invited to participate in workshops with government members and leaders from the private sector. They talked about social, economic issues and found solutions to encourage entrepreneurship for young Africans.

On 23 June 2014, he was a speaker at the 3rd Islamic Development Bank Youth Forum, during the Islamic Development Bank's 40th Anniversary event in Jeddah, Saudi Arabia. He was invited to talk on the theme of "Youth Entrepreneurship: From Job Seekers to Job Creators". 

In September 2014, Madlyn Cazalis founder won "The Get in the Ring – Investment Battle" Competition in Cameroon and was listed as one of "The 10 Most Promising Startups of Africa" by BiD Network and the Erasmus Centre for Entrepreneurship. The African Final was held in Kigali (Rwanda) and hosted by BiD Network.

In October 2014, Ngan was elected Member of the World Entrepreneurship Forum in Lyon (France).

In October 2014, Ngan was a temporary lecturer for ISCOM a leading French communication school in Paris where he taught a Business Model class. He was also a temporary lecturer for the Paris School of Business (previously known as ESG School of Management) where he taught Management Science class.

The same month, he was elected for a three-year period in the Youth Advisory Board of Brand Africa (South Africa). The Youth Advisory Board consists of influential youth of African heritage who are active in public, private, or civil society initiatives which aim to accelerate Africa's socio-economic development. He prepared the Africa Youth Prize for Social Entrepreneurship and Innovation, under the High Patronage of the African Union Commission.

On 8 November 2014, he was a speaker at the 2nd edition of the Global Entrepreneurship Summit in Marrakech (Morocco).

In January 2015, Ngan was one of the 9 young African entrepreneurs selected by ALN Ventures, an  African Leadership Network accelerator, created by Fred Swaniker and Acha Leke. Madlyn Cazalis was selected as one of the 8 Most Promising Young companies in Africa, among 277 African start-ups to participate in a 9-month program held in Johannesburg (South Africa).  In June 2015, ALN Foundation purchased a 5% equity stake in Goldsky Partners SARL, the parent company of Madlyn Cazalis at a half-million dollars valuation.

In February 2016, Christian Ngan was a speaker at the 4th Forum International Afrique Développement in Casablanca, Morocco.

On 27 and 28 August 2016, he was invited by United Nations University to the 6th Tokyo International Conference on African Development (TICAD VI) in Nairobi, Kenya, where he met Akinwumi Adesina, Group President of the African Development Bank. In October 2018, the university invited Ngan to Tokyo, Japan, to initiate dialogue between young African entrepreneurs and African researchers promoting sustainable industrial development.

In 2018, Madlyn Cazalis invested $3 million in the construction of a new factory in Yaoundé.

Honors and awards
In 2014 and 2015, Ngan was listed in Forbes magazine's "30 Most Promising Young Entrepreneurs in Africa", the first Cameroonian businessman to be included in a Forbes list. 

He was twice listed in The Choiseul 100 Africa: Economic Leaders for Tomorrow, listed by Young People in International Affairs (YPIA) in the "Top 35 Africans under 35 in 2014", listed among the 3 Most Influential Entrepreneurs in Cameroon, one of the Top 40 African Visionaries, Top 100 African Doers and nominated for CNBC Africa's West African Young Business Leader of The Year in 2014.

In April 2013, Ngan received an honorary diploma delivered by the Catholic University of Central Africa to Madlyn Cazalis for promoting youth business initiatives in Africa.

On 8 September 2014, Ngan was Country Winner of Titans Building Nations Award for Best SME CEO delivered by CEO Communications. The ceremony was held in Accra (Ghana).

Institut Choiseul for International Politics and Geoeconomics, in its first edition of The Choiseul 100 Africa:Economic Leaders for Tomorrow, which was released in September 2014, listed Christian Ngan among "growing business leaders, successful entrepreneurs, investors, etc.," that "embody the dynamism and renewal of a whole continent and carry the hopes of an entire generation." The list "identifies and ranks the young African leaders of 40 years old and under, who will play a major role in the development of Africa in the near future."

In October 2015, Christian Ngan was listed among the 25 African Leaders in 2015 by Diva Magazine.

In December 2017, during the 60 years celebration of the Groupement Inter-Patronal du Cameroun, he received an "award" from André Siaka, former CEO of Brasseries du Cameroun and former president of the organization, to represent the new generation of Cameroonian Entrepreneurs.

In October 2019, he was a judge for the Anzisha Prize in South Africa. A business competition supporting entrepreneurs between 15 and 22 years old. Each year, 20 finalists share in $100,000 of prize money to invest in their businesses or projects and join the Anzisha Fellowship through which they receive ongoing support to grow as professionals to expand their enterprises.

References

1983 births
Living people
Cameroonian businesspeople
People from Yaoundé
Emlyon Business School alumni
University of Paris alumni